Picus peregrinabundus is a species of woodpecker from the late Miocene first described by Soviet scientist Umanskaja in 1981. It lived in what is now Ukraine. The species relationships have been called into question and need to be rechecked. The species is only known from a left tarsometatarsus.

Paleoecology
Picus peregrinabundus lived with Gavia paradoxa and the falcon Falco medius, all in the Odessa Region of the Ukraine near the city of Myhai. During its time Europe was covered by forests.

References

Miocene first appearances
Picus (genus)